Euphratensis (Latin for "Euphratean"; , Euphratēsía), fully Augusta Euphratensis, was a late Roman and then Byzantine province in Syrian region, part of the Byzantine Diocese of the East.

History
Sometime between 330 and 350 AD (likely ), the Roman province of Euphratensis was created out of the territory of Coele Syria along the western bank of the Euphrates. It included the territories of Commagene and Cyrrhestice. Its capital was Cyrrus or perhaps Hierapolis Bambyce. It remained within the Byzantine Empire following the 395 division of the empire by Theodosius I.

The province is listed in the Laterculus Veronensis from around 314.

The Roman Catholic and Orthodox saints Sergius and Bacchus were supposedly martyred in the city of Resafa in Euphratensis, and the city was later renamed Sergiopolis. Other cities in the province were Samosata and Zeugma.

References 

Late Roman Syria
Late Roman provinces
Provinces of the Byzantine Empire
States and territories established in the 4th century
4th-century establishments in the Roman Empire
States and territories disestablished in the 7th century